Sebbe De Buck (born 14 March 1995) is a Belgian snowboarder. He competed in the 2018 Winter Olympics.

References

External links
 
 
 
 

1995 births
Living people
Snowboarders at the 2018 Winter Olympics
Belgian male snowboarders
Olympic snowboarders of Belgium
Snowboarders at the 2012 Winter Youth Olympics